Soul Hustler, also known as The Day the Lord Got Busted, is a 1973 American feature film starring Fabian as a preacher.

Plot
Singer Matthew Crowe (Fabian Forte) teams up with a tent show preacher (Tony Russel) who uses him as part of his touring show. Matthew lands a record deal and the preacher becomes his manager. They hire a group of musicians and become very successful. However, his new fortune increases his dependence on drugs, and his off-stage carousing threatens his career.

Production
The film was shot in San Diego in 1971.

During production the film used the title That Lovin' Man Jesus and later The Love-In Man. It was also known as Matthew. Fabian filmed part of the picture at an Osmonds Concert at LA Forum – it was his first public singing performance in ten years.

Release
The film was released theatrically in the south but was a commercial disappointment.

References

External links

1973 films
American musical drama films
1973 drama films
Films directed by Burt Topper
Films produced by Burt Topper
1970s English-language films
1970s American films